The 2008–09 season was Adelaide United Women's first season in the W-League and first overall season in the top flight Australian soccer.

Players

Transfers

Transfers in

Squad statistics

Appearances and goals

{| class="wikitable sortable plainrowheaders" style="text-align:center"
|-
! rowspan="2" |
! rowspan="2" |
! rowspan="2" style="width:180px;" |Name
! colspan="2" style="width:87px;" |W-League
! colspan="2" style="width:87px;" |Total
|-
!
!Goals
!
!Goals
|-
|1
|GK
! scope="row" | Emma Wirkus

|4
|0

!4
!0
|-
|2
|DF
! scope="row" | Renee Harrison

|8+1
|0

!9
!0
|-
|3
|DF
! scope="row" | Sarah Amorim

|9
|0

!9
!0
|-
|4
|DF
! scope="row" | Dianne Alagich

|10
|0

!10
!0
|-
|5
|MF
! scope="row" | Angela Fimmano

|2+4
|0

!6
!0
|-
|6
|DF
! scope="row" | Kristyn Swaffer

|10
|1

!10
!1
|-
|7
|FW
! scope="row" | Racheal Quigley

|3+4
|0

!7
!0
|-
|8
|FW
! scope="row" | Sandra Scalzi

|7+1
|4

!8
!4
|-
|9
|FW
! scope="row" | Stephanie Tokich

|7+3
|0

!10
!0
|-
|10
|FW
! scope="row" | Victoria Balomenos

|9
|3

!9
!3
|-
|11
|MF
! scope="row" | Sharon Black

|8+1
|3

!9
!3
|-
|12
|MF
! scope="row" | Tanya Harrison

|4+5
|0

!9
!0
|-
|13
|MF
! scope="row" | Leah Robinson

|5
|0

!5
!0
|-
|14
|FW
! scope="row" | Donna Cockayne

|4+4
|1

!8
!1
|-
|15
|MF
! scope="row" | Lauren Chilvers

|4+4
|0

!8
!0
|-
|17
|MF
! scope="row" | April Mann

|7+1
|0

!8
!0
|-
|20
|GK
! scope="row" | Sian McLaren

|4+1
|0

!5
!0
|-
|30
|GK
! scope="row" | Kristi Harvey

|2
|0

!2
!0
|-
|—
|MF
! scope="row" | Nenita Burgess

|1
|0

!1
!0
|}

Disciplinary record

Clean sheets

Competitions

Overview

{|class="wikitable" style="text-align:left"
|-
!rowspan=2 style="width:140px;"|Competition
!colspan=8|Record
|-
!style="width:40px;"|
!style="width:40px;"|
!style="width:40px;"|
!style="width:40px;"|
!style="width:40px;"|
!style="width:40px;"|
!style="width:40px;"|
!style="width:70px;"|
|-
|W-League

|-
!Total

W-League

League table

Results by matchday

Matches

External links
 Adelaide United Official Website

Adelaide United FC (A-League Women) seasons
Adelaide United Women